Ramón de la Fuente may refer to:
Ramón de la Fuente Muñiz (1921–2006), Mexican psychiatrist
Juan Ramón de la Fuente (born 1951), Mexican psychiatrist, son of the above
Ramón de la Fuente Leal (1907–1973), Spanish footballer